Andy Amadi Okoroafor  is a Nigerian filmmaker as well as a TED speaker. He is most notable as the director of the 2010 film Relentless. Apart from direction, he is also a writer, producer and art director. He is the founder of creative studio 'Clam'.

Personal life
He was born on 8 February 1966 in Bauchi, Northern Nigeria. He was one year old when the war started in Biafra. Later he moved to Paris, France and worked as an art director in advertising, fashion and music videos. He is also a TED-Fellow.

Career
In France, Okoroafor spent five years art directing music videos as well as their imagery, from the album covers to music video. He established the creative studio called 'Clam' and the 'Clam magazine' in 1999. The magazine is published two times a year in Japan, the US, Europe, and Brazil. At the 2017 exhibition, he directed the show Never Surrender, at M. Bassy in Hamburg, Germany. The show included photography and video installations in the series, More Aphrike. With the series, he collaborated with fellow photographer and filmmaker, Andrew Dosunmu.

In 2010, Okoroafor made the film Relentless, his first feature film. In October 2010, the film was selected for the London film festival, and screened on 6 December 2010 at the Africa International Film Festival in Port Harcourt for the first time in Africa.

Filmography

References

External links
 

Living people
Nigerian film directors
1966 births